A. J. Watson (May 8, 1924 – May 12, 2014) was a car builder and chief mechanic from 1949 through 1984 in the Indianapolis 500, winning the race six times as a car builder. Rodger Ward won 18 races driving Watson cars.

A native of southern California, Watson came to Indianapolis in 1948 but missed the race.  He returned the following year with a home-built car that failed to qualify.  For the next 11 years, his cars not only qualified but were leaders in many years.

From 1955 to 1958 he was associated with the John Zink team, and from 1959 on with Bob Wilke. His first win as a car builder came in 1956 when Pat Flaherty drove the John Zink entry to victory in that year's Indy 500. Watson had won the previous year as a crew chief for Bob Sweikert. Watson's cars dominated the race through 1964.  Although he continued entering cars for another two decades, he was never able to regain the commanding position of his heyday.

In 1964, with many teams following Lotus's example and moving to rear-engined "funny cars", Watson built a pair of cars based on Rolla Vollstedt's successful car.  These worked reasonably well but could not reproduce the success he had with his front-engined "roadsters".  He built monocoque rear-engined cars in 1966 and 1967 with ever-decreasing success.

From 1969 until 1977, Watson ran Eagles and then built a small series of highly derivative new "Watson" cars in 1977, 1978 and again in 1982 based on Lightning and March designs before retiring. He is frequently listed on the Indy 500 entry sheet as the "race strategist" for PDM Racing, though his role with the team is largely honorary. He died on May 12, 2014 at the age of 90.

Career awards
 He was inducted in the National Sprint Car Hall of Fame in 1993.
 He was inducted in the Motorsports Hall of Fame of America in 1996.

References

External links

 Legendary Mechanic Celebrating 50th Year at Indy

1924 births
American racecar constructors
Auto racing crew chiefs
Formula One constructors (Indianapolis only)
Indianapolis 500
International Motorsports Hall of Fame inductees
2014 deaths
National Sprint Car Hall of Fame inductees
People from California
Sportspeople from California